This is a list of children's hospitals, hospitals that specialize in pediatrics.

A children's hospital is a hospital that offers its services exclusively to children and adolescents. Most children's hospitals can serve people from birth up to the age of 21. The number of children's hospitals proliferated in the 20th century, as pediatric medical and surgical specialties separated from internal medicine and adult surgical specialties.

Children's hospitals are characterized by greater attention to the psychosocial support of children and their families. Some children and young people have to spend relatively long periods in the hospital, so having access to play and teaching staff can also be an important part of their care. With local partnerships, this can include trips to local botanical gardens, the zoo, and public libraries, for instance.

In addition to psychosocial support, children's hospitals have the added benefit of being staffed by professionals who are trained in treating children. A medical doctor that undertakes vocational training in pediatrics must also be accepted for membership by a professional college before they can practice pediatrics. While many normal hospitals can treat children adequately, pediatric specialists may be a better choice when it comes to treating rare afflictions that may prove fatal or severely detrimental to young children, in some cases before birth. Also, many children's hospitals will continue to see children with rare illnesses into adulthood, allowing for a continuity of care.

International
 Shriners Hospitals for Children, North America

Argentina

Ciudad Autónoma de Buenos Aires
 Hospital Italiano de Buenos Aires
 Garrahan Pediatric Hospital
 Hospital de Niños R. Gutierrez
 Hospital Pedro de Elizalde ex Casa Cuna

Cordoba
 Children's Hospital of the Holy Trinity
 Pediatric Hospital of the Child Jesus

Tucuman
 Hospital del Niño Jesus

Australia

Australian Capital Territory
 Centenary Hospital for Women and Children, Canberra

Queensland
 Queensland Children's Hospital, Brisbane
 Mater Childrens Hospital (former children's hospital in Brisbane)
 Royal Children's Hospital, Herston (former children's hospital in Brisbane)
 The Prince Charles Hospital, Brisbane (Combined Adult/Children's Hospital)

New South Wales
 John Hunter Children's Hospital, Newcastle
 Sydney Children's Hospital, Randwick
 The Children's Hospital at Westmead

South Australia
 Women's and Children's Hospital, Adelaide

Victoria
 Monash Children's Hospital, Clayton
 Royal Children's Hospital, Parkville

Western Australia
 Perth Children's Hospital

Austria
 Anna-Kinderspital, former children's hospital in Graz
 Gottfried von Preyer’sches Kinderspital, Vienna
 Karolinen-Kinderspital, former children's hospital in Vienna
 Kinderklinik Glanzing, Vienna, integrated into Wilhelminenspital
 Kindersanatorium Sonnegg, Hirschegg (Vorarlberg)
 Landes-Kinderkrankenhaus, Linz
 Leopoldstädter Kinderspital, former children's hospital in Vienna
 Mautner Markhof’sches Kinderspital, former children's hospital in Vienna
 St. Anna Kinderspital, Vienna
 Sankt-Josef-Kinderspital, former children's hospital in Vienna

Belgium

Bangladesh
 Aurobindo Childrens Hospital, Bangladesh

Chittagong
 Chittagong Maa-Shishu O General Hospital, Agrabad, Chittagong

Dhaka
 Dhaka Shishu Hospital

Brazil

São Paulo
 HIS - Hospital Infantil Sabará

Curitiba
 HPP - Hospital Pequeno Príncipe

Fortaleza
 HIAS - Hospital Infantil Albert Sabin

Recife
 IMIP - Instituto Materno-Infantil Professor Fernando Figueira

Porto Alegre 

 Hospital da Criança Santo Antônio

Canada

Alberta
Alberta Children's Hospital, Calgary
Stollery Children's Hospital, Edmonton

British Columbia
 British Columbia Children's Hospital, Vancouver

Manitoba
 The Children's Hospital of Winnipeg, Winnipeg

Newfoundland and Labrador
 Janeway Children's Health and Rehabilitation Centre, St. John's

Nova Scotia
 IWK Health Centre, Halifax

Ontario
 Children's Hospital at London Health Sciences Centre, London
 Children's Hospital of Eastern Ontario, Ottawa
 Holland Bloorview Kids Rehabilitation Hospital, Toronto
 The Hospital for Sick Children, Toronto
 McMaster Children's Hospital, Hamilton

Quebec
 Centre hospitalier universitaire Sainte-Justine, Montreal
 Centre mère-enfant du centre hospitalier de l'Université Laval, Quebec City
 Montreal Children's Hospital, Montreal
 Shriners Hospital for Children – Canada, Montreal (orthopedics)

Saskatchewan
 Jim Pattison Children's Hospital, Saskatoon

Chile
 Hospital Exequiel Gonzalez Cortes, Santiago
 Hospital Luis Calvo Mackenna, Santiago
 Hospital Roberto del Río, Santiago

China

Beijing 
 Beijing New Century International Hospital for Children (private)
 Children's Hospital of Capital Institute of Pediatrics
 Shanghai Children's Hospital, Capital Medical University

Shanghai 
 Children's Hospital of Fudan University
 Shanghai Jiao Tong University School of Medicine
 International Peace Maternity and Child Health Hospital, China Welfare Institute
 Shanghai Children's Hospital
 Shanghai Children's Medical Center

Colombia
 Fundación Hospital de la Misericordia
 Hospital Infantil Napoleón Franco Pareja
 Fundación Clínica Infantil Club Noel
 Hospital Infantil Universitario de San José

Croatia
 Children's hospital Srebrnjak, Zagreb
 Clinic for child diseases Zagreb, Zagreb

Finland
 Childrens Castle, Helsinki
 Eye and Ear hospital, Helsinki
 Helsinki Children's Hospital, Helsinki
 Jorvi Hospital, Espoo
 Kätilöopisto Maternity Hospital, Helsinki
 Women's clinic, Helsinki

France
 Necker–Enfants Malades Hospital, Paris
 Hôpital Armand-Trousseau, Paris
 Hôpital Robert Debré, Paris
 Hôpital Femme Mères Enfants de Bron, Lyon
 La Timone-Enfants, Marseille
 Hôpital Jeanne de Flandres, Lille
 Hôpital d'Enfants de Brabois, Nancy
 Hôpital d'Enfants de Hautepierre, Strasbourg
 Hôpital Enfants-Adolescent, Nantes
 :Centre hospitalier universitaire Clocheville, Tours

Germany
 Altonaer Kinderkrankenhaus, Hamburg
 Asklepios Kinderklinik Sankt Augustin
 Bergmannsheil und Kinderklinik Buer, Gelsenkirchen
 Clementine Kinderhospital, Frankfurt a. M.
 Cnopf´sche Kinderklinik, Nürnberg
 Darmstädter Kinderkliniken Prinzessin Margaret
 Dr. von Haunersches Kinderspital, München
 DRK-Kinderklinik Siegen
 Elisabeth-Kinderkrankenhaus, Oldenburg
 Jenaer Universitäts-Kinderklinik
 Josefinum, Augsburg
 Katholisches Kinderkrankenhaus Wilhelmstift, Hamburg
 Kinder- und Jugendklinik Gelsenkirchen
 Kinder-Universitätsklinikum-Ostbayern, Regensburg
 Kinderhospital Osnabrück
 Kinderklinik, Dresden
 Kinderklinik an der Lachnerstraße, München
 Kinderklinik der Ruhr-Universität, Bochum
 Kinderklinik der Universität Greifswald
 Kinderklinik Dritter Orden, Passau
 Kinderklinik Augsburg, Augsburg
 Kinderklinik Lindenhof, Berlin
 Kinderklinik, Universitätsklinikum Schleswig-Holstein, Campus Kiel
 Kinderklinik, Universitätsklinikum Schleswig-Holstein, Campus Lübeck
 Kinderkrankenhaus auf der Bult, Hannover
 Kinderkrankenhaus Park Schönfeld, Kassel
 Kinderkrankenhaus Rothenburgsort, Hamburg
 Kinderkrankenhaus St. Annastift, Ludwigshafen
 Kindernachsorgeklinik Berlin-Brandenburg, Bernau
 Kinderkrankenhaus Amsterdamer Straße, Köln
 Kinderklinik am Klinikum Schwabing
 Olgahospital, Stuttgart
 Oppenheimsches Kinderhospital, Köln
 Professor-Hess-Kinderklinik, Bremen
 Universitäts-Kinderklinik am Universitätsklinikum Würzburg
 Universitätskinderklinik Giessen, Giessen
 Vestische Kinder- und Jugendklinik Datteln

Hong Kong 
 The Duchess of Kent Children's Hospital at Sandy Bay, Sandy Bay
 Hong Kong Children's Hospital

Defunct
 Victoria Hospital for Women and Children, 17 Barker Road, The Peak (1897–1947)

Hungary

 Bethesda Children's Hospital, Budapest 
 Buda's Children's Hospital of St. John Hospital, Budapest
 Debrecen Medicine University - Pediatrics Clinic, Debrecen
 Heim Pál Children's Hospital, Budapest
 Madarász Street Children's Hospital of Heim Pál Children's Hospital, Budapest
 Pécs Medicine University - Pediatrics Clinic, Pécs
 Semmelweis University - 1st Pediatrics Clinic, Budapest
 Semmelweis University - 2nd Pediatrics Clinic, Budapest
 Szeged Medicine University - Pediatrics Clinic, Szeged
 Vadaskert Children's Psychiatric Specialist Hospital, Budapest
 Velkey László Children's Health Center of Borsod - Abaúj- Zemplén County Hospital, Miskolc

Ireland, Republic of
 Our Lady's Children's Hospital, Crumlin
 Tallaght Children's Hospital, Tallaght
 Temple Street Children's University Hospital, Dublin

Israel
 Dana-Dwek Children’s Hospital, Tel Aviv Sourasky Medical Center Tel Aviv
 The Edmond and Lily Safra Children’s Hospital and the Edmond J. Safra International Congenital Heart Center, Tel Hashomer
 Ruth Rappaport Children's Hospital, Rambam Health Care Campus Haifa
 Saban Children's Center, Soroka Hospital Be'er Sheva
 Schneider Children's Medical Center of Israel, Petah Tikva
 ALYN Woldenberg Family Hospital Pediatric and Adolescent Rehabilitation Center, Jerusalem

Italy
 Bambino Gesù Hospital, Rome
 Burlo Garofolo Pediatric Institute, Trieste
 Dipartimento di Salute della Donna e del Bambino, Azienda Ospedaliera di Padova - Università di Padova
 G. Di Cristina Children Hospital, Palermo
 Istituto Giannina Gaslini, Genoa
 Meyer Children's Hospital, Florence
 Ospedale Regina Margherita, Torino
 Triacorda children's hospital, department of pediatrics at Salento University, Lecce
Jamaica
Bustamante Hospital for Children

Japan
 Kanagawa Children's Medical Center, Yokohama
 National Center for Child Health and Development, Tokyo
 Miyagi Children's Hospital, Sendai
 Ibaraki Children's Hospital, Mito, Ibaraki
 Jichhi Children's Medical Center, Tochigi
 Chiba Children's Hospital, Chiba
 Tokyo Metropolitan Children's Medical Center, Tokyo
 Saitama Children's Medical Center, Saitama
 Shizuoka Children' Hospital, Shizuoka
 Aichi Children's Health and Medical Center, Obu, Aichi
 Osaka Medical Center and Research Institute for Maternal and Child Health, Izumi, Osaka
 Hyogo Children's Hospital, Kobe
 Fukuoka Children' Hospital, Fukuoka

Kenya
 Gertrude's Children's Hospital
 Shoe4Africa Childrens Hospital, Eldoret

Lebanon
 Children's Cancer Center of Lebanon, Rue Clémenceau, Beirut

Malaysia
 UKM Specialist Children’s Hospital, Kuala Lumpur

The Netherlands
 Beatrix Kinderziekenhuis, Groningen
 Emma Kinderziekenhuis, Amsterdam
 Juliana Kinderziekenhuis, The Hague
 Kinderziekenhuis Sint Radboud, Nijmegen
 Sophia Kinderziekenhuis, Rotterdam
 Wilhelmina Kinderziekenhuis, Utrecht
 Prinses Maxima Centrum, Utrecht

New Zealand
 Kidz First Children's Hospital, Middlemore Hospital, Auckland
 Starship Hospital, Grafton Auckland

Mexico
 Hospital Infantil de Mexico
 Instituto Nacional de Pediatria
 Other children's hospitals in Mexico City, that belong to the Federal District Health Secretariat:
 Hospital Materno Pediatrico Xochimilco
 Hospital Pediatrico Azcapotzalco
 Hospital Pediatrico Iztacalco
 Hospital Pediatrico Iztapalpa
 Hospital Pediatrico La Villa
 Hospital Pediatrico Legaria
 Hospital Pediatrico Moctezuma
 Hospital Pediatrico San Juan De Aragon
 Hospital Pediatrico Villa

Pakistan

Faisalabad
 Faisalabad Institute of Child Care

Islamabad
 IHS Children's Medical Center

Lahore
 The Children's Hospital, Lahore

Peshawar
 Khyber Children Hospital, Danishabad

Philippines
National Children's Hospital, Quezon City
Philippine Children's Medical Center, Quezon City

Portugal
 CHULC - Hospital Dona Estefânia, Lisbon
 CHUC - Hospital Pediátrico, Coimbra
 CHUP - Centro Materno-Infantil do Norte, Porto

South Africa
 KwaZulu-Natal Children's Hospital, Durban
 Red Cross War Memorial Children's Hospital, Cape Town
 Nelson Mandela Children's Hospital, Gauteng

Spain

Barcelona
 Hospital Sant Joan de Deu
 Hospital Materno-Infantil Vall Hebron

Madrid
 Hospital Infantil La Paz (part of General Hospital La Paz)
 Hospital Infantil Universitario Niño Jesús
 Hospital Marterno-Infantil 12 de Octubre (part of University Hospital 12 de Octubre de Madrid)
 Hospital Materno-Infantil Gregorio Marañon (part of General Hospital Gregorio Marañón)

Sri Lanka
 Lady Ridgeway Hospital for Children, Colombo
 Sirimavo Bandaranayake Specialized Children Hospital, Peradeniya

Sweden
 Astrid Lindgren Children's Hospital (Astrid Lindgrens Barnsjukhus, Solna
 Huddinge Children's Hospital (Huddinge Barnsjukhus), Huddinge
 Queen Silvia Children's Hospital (Drottning Silvias barn- och ungdomssjukhus), Gothenburg
 Sachsska Children's Hospital (Sachsska Barnsjukhuset), Stockholm
 Skåne University Hospital's Pediatric Care Hospital (Barn- och ungdomssjukhuset, BUS) Lund
 Uppsala University Children's Hospital (Akademiska barnsjukhuset), Uppsala

Switzerland
 Kinderspital Wildermeth, Biel/Bienne
 Kinderspital Zürich, Zürich-Hottingen
 Ostschweizer Kinderspital, St. Gallen
 University Children’s Hospital Basel, Basel

Taiwan
 Chang Gung Children's Hospital, Taipei
 National Taiwan University Children's Hospital, Taipei

United Arab Emirates
 Al Jalila Children's Specialty Hospital, Dubai

United Kingdom

England
 Addenbrooke's Hospital, Cambridge
 Alder Hey Children's Hospital, Liverpool
 Belgrave Hospital for Children, London
 Birmingham Children's Hospital, Birmingham
 Bristol Royal Hospital for Children, Bristol
 Chailey Heritage School, East Sussex
 Chelsea and Westminster Hospital, London
 Children's Day Hospital, London
 Derbyshire Children's Hospital, Derby
 Evelina London Children's Hospital, London
 Foundling Hospital, London
 Great North Children's Hospital, Newcastle Upon Tyne
 Great Ormond Street Hospital, London
 John Radcliffe Hospital (Oxford Children's Hospital), Oxford
 King's College Hospital, London
 Leeds General Infirmary (Leeds Children's Hospital), Leeds
 Nottingham Children's Hospital, Nottingham
 Portland Hospital for Women and Children, London (non-NHS)
 Queen Elizabeth Hospital for Children, London
 Queen Mary's Hospital for Children, Surrey
 Royal Alexandra Children's Hospital (Princess Alexandra Hospital for Sick Children), Brighton
 Royal London Hospital, Whitechapel
 Royal Manchester Children's Hospital, Manchester
 Royal Waterloo Hospital for Children and Women, London
  Shropshire Women’s and Children’s Centre, Princess Royal Hospital, Telford
 St George's Hospital, London
 St Mary's Hospital, London, Paddington
 Sheffield Children's Hospital, Sheffield
 Southampton Children's Hospital, Southampton
 Stoke Mandeville Hospital, Aylesbury
 University Hospital Lewisham, London

Northern Ireland
 Royal Belfast Hospital for Sick Children, Belfast

Scotland
 Royal Aberdeen Children's Hospital, Aberdeen
 Royal Hospital for Children, Glasgow
 Royal Hospital for Sick Children, Edinburgh

Wales
 Noah's Ark Children's Hospital for Wales, Cardiff

United States

Vietnam

Vietnam National Hospital of Pediatrics

See also
 Children's Hospital (disambiguation)

References

 Children's hospitals
Children's hospitals